Epoca may refer to:

Media
 Epoca (magazine), Italian news magazine published, 1950–1997
 Época (Brazilian magazine), Brazilian news magazine established in 1998
 Época (Spanish magazine), Spanish weekly news magazine, 1985–2013
 La Epoca, weekly newspaper that operated in Guatemala for four months in 1988
 La Epoca (Ladino newspaper), Ladino newspaper published in Ottoman Empire, 1875–1912

Others
 EPOCA, acronym of Exèrcit Popular Català, Catalan separatist paramilitary group
 European Project on Ocean Acidification